AMM Higher Secondary School or in its full name Abraham Marthoma Memorial Higher Secondary School is a higher secondary school situated in Edayaranmula, Pathanamthitta, Kerala, India.

Authority
 Rev. Fr. Johnson Varghese - school manager
 Mr. Samgi Mathew - secretary
 Mrs. Karuna Saras Thomas - principal
 Mrs. Annamma Ninan M - headmistress
 Mr. Saju chacko  - PTA president

Affiliation
The school is affiliated to the Kerala State syllabus.

Facilities
This school provides free education from 5th standard to 12th standard.
The school has a wide range of excellent facilities, including:
1. Digital Den (School IT Lab)
2. Multimedia Lab
3. Smart Class Rooms
4. Knowledge Cabinet
5. Guidance and Counselling
6. Clubs
7. Non-Meel Feeding Programme
8. School HealthProgrammes
9. Games 7 Sports
10. Cultural Competitions
11. Sasthramela & Work Experience
12. Counselling Cell & IEDSS Resources
13. J.R.C
14. School Library
15. Science Labs
16. Play Grounds
17. high-tech classes
18. projector on all classes

Other activities
NCC, NSS units, Social Service League, Medical Check Up, Student Police Units, Scout & Guides, Hobby Workshop, Communicative English classes.

References

High schools and secondary schools in Kerala
Christian schools in Kerala
Schools in Pathanamthitta district
Educational institutions established in 1919
1919 establishments in India